These are the official results of the Women's long jump event at the 1972 Summer Olympics in Munich. The competition was held on 31 August.

Qualifying
All jumpers reaching  and the top 12 including ties advanced to the final round.  All qualifiers are shown in blue.  All heights are in metres.

Overall Qualifying

Final
At the end of three jobs the top eight received another three jumps.  The remaining were eliminated from medal contention.

Key: NM = no mark; DNS = did not start; x = fault; T = tied

References

External links
Official report

Women's long jump
Long jump at the Olympics
1972 in women's athletics
Women's events at the 1972 Summer Olympics